Karel Nováček (born 30 March 1965) is a retired Czech former top ten tennis player born in Prostějov, Czechoslovakia (Czech Republic). In his career, Nováček won 13 singles titles and six doubles titles. His highest singles ranking was World No. 8, which he achieved on 18 November 1991.

His best performance at a Grand Slam came at the 1994 US Open where he defeated Alexander Vladimirovich Volkov, Andriy Medvedev, Todd Woodbridge, Javier Frana and Jaime Yzaga before losing to Michael Stich in the semifinal. In 1997, Novacek was suspended for three months for failing a drug test at the 1995 French Open; he forfeited $185,765, but denied taking cocaine knowingly.

Nováček lived in Boca Raton, Florida, United States for 20 years, and then moved back to Czech Republic. Karel and Maya Nováček married in 1990; as of 2002, they had three children. In 2002, the Boca Raton News reported that their ten-year-old daughter Anika was a promising tennis player, winning several tournaments.

Career finals

Singles (13 titles, 7 runners-up)

Doubles (6 titles, 10 runners-up)

Singles performance timeline

Records

See also
List of sportspeople sanctioned for doping offences

References

External links 
 
 
 

1965 births
Czech male tennis players
Czechoslovak male tennis players
Doping cases in tennis
Hopman Cup competitors
Living people
Sportspeople from Prostějov
Czech sportspeople in doping cases
Goodwill Games medalists in tennis
Competitors at the 1986 Goodwill Games